The Unamenables is a 1959 Soviet comedy, directorial debut of Yuri Chulyukin.

Plot
Two foolish and frivolous guys cause suffering for the whole work team at the factory. It was already decided to fire Anatoly Gracchkin (Yuri Belov) and his friend Victor Gromoboev (Alexei Kozhevnikov), but they are taken under the wing by Nadia Berestova (Nadezhda Rumyantseva), a diminutive funny woman, known as the popular one at the plant.

Because of Nadia's status of a respectable and reliable person, the Komsomol members, without wasting time immediately give her the assignment to re-educate the boys. At first, Nadya takes it with reluctance and apprehension, but gradually this task becomes the most important thing in her life. She prepares for  mischief-makers a daily plan and a list of books to read, brings them a lectures about marine biology, talks about Goncharov's novel Oblomov...

However, after Grachkin and Gromoboev succeed in tricking Nadya more than once, she understands that standard methods in this situation will not help.

Cast
Nadezhda Rumyantseva – Nadia Berestova
Yuri Belov – Tolya Grachkin
Alexei Kozhevnikov – Victor Gromoboev
Valentin Kozlov – Volodya Yakovlev
Vera Karpova – Rosa Katkova
Svetlana Kharitonova – Lisa Kukushkina's friend Nadi
Victor Egorov – Leon Butusov
Yuri Nikulin – Vasily Klyachkin
Konstantin Nassonov – plant director Andrei Ilich Baryshev
Ivan Kashirin – workshop master Ivan Ignatievich Vatagin
Victor Terekhov – Petya
Vladimir Zemlyanikin – Zernov
Yevgeny Bykadorov – diving coach
Lilia Gritsenko – Nadia's mother
Leonid Marennikov – waiter Pasha
Vladimir Picek – waiter
Nina Agapova – host of the dancing contest
Sergey Filippov – the policeman
Tamara Yarenko – episode
Zinaida Tarahovskaya – episode
Sasha Smirnov – boy who brought the cutter

Awards
At the All-Union Film Festival in Minsk in 1960, the film received the prize for best comedy. Also, Nadezhda Rumyantseva was awarded for the best performance of the female role and Yuri Belov for the best performance of the male role.

References

External links

 The film with English subtitles

Mosfilm films
1959 comedy films
1959 films
Soviet comedy films
1959 directorial debut films
Soviet black-and-white films